Nowe Skalmierzyce  is a town and its surrounding municipality in Ostrów Wielkopolski County, Greater Poland Voivodeship, in west-central Poland. The town has a population of 5,093 (2006 est.), while the municipality, Gmina Nowe Skalmierzyce, which is a mixed urban-rural gmina that includes the town, has a population of 15,191. The town has a land area of only 1.58 km², which results in a population density of 3,223.4 persons/km², the seventh-highest density of all towns in Poland, and the second-highest density (after Swarzędz) of the urban portion of any Polish urban-rural gmina (gmina miejsko-wiejska). The gmina has a land area of 125.42 km².

Nowe Skalmierzyce ("New Skalmierzyce") adjoins the urbanized village of Skalmierzyce, which is in fact the administrative seat of the gmina.

History
Nowe Skalmierzyce originally developed as a customs post on the border between Prussia and Russian-controlled Congress Poland in the 19th century. In 1908 it was separated from the old village of Skalmierzyce, and it remained a separate settlement since. After World War I, in November 1918, Poland regained independence, and shortly after the Greater Poland Uprising broke out, which aim was to reintegrate the region of Greater Poland with Poland. Nowe Skalmierzyce was the first settlement in the area to be liberated by Polish insurgents. Afterwards, within interwar Poland, it formed part of the Poznań Voivodeship.

During the German occupation (World War II), a transit camp for Poles expelled from the region was operated in the local school. Poles were deported from the camp either to the General Government (German-occupied central Poland) or to concentration camps.

Nowe Skalmierzyce was granted town rights in 1962.

Sights
In the town, there are monuments commemorating the Greater Poland Uprising of 1918–1919 and the prisoners of the former Nazi German transit camp for Poles expelled from the region.

Sports
It competes in the lower leagues.

References

External links
 Official website 

Cities and towns in Greater Poland Voivodeship
Ostrów Wielkopolski County